Joke Devynck (born 10 October 1972) is a Belgian actress. She appeared in more than thirty films since 1994.

Personal life
For 19 years she lived together with the Flemish actor Johan Heldenbergh in Hofstade in Aalst, Belgium. On 17 September 2013 it became public that the two actors separated. They have three children; two are twins.

In the 2010 Belgian federal election Devynck was a candidate for the Groen party.

Selected filmography

References

External links
 

1972 births
Living people
People from Poperinge
Flemish film actresses
Flemish television actresses